You've Got a Friend is the twenty-eighth studio album by American pop singer Andy Williams, released in August 1971 by Columbia Records. The album bears a striking resemblance to the Johnny Mathis album You've Got a Friend released that same month. Besides sharing their name, the two albums are both made up of covers of easy listening hits of the time, with 11 songs each, and the two albums have seven songs in common that are positioned in a similar order.

The Williams album made its first appearance on Billboard magazine's Top LP's & Tapes chart in the issue dated August 28, 1971, and remained there for 12 weeks, peaking at number 54.  For its release in the UK, the album was entitled A Song for You.

The single from the album, "A Song for You", entered the Hot 100 in the US in the issue of Billboard dated August 21, 1971, and stayed on the chart for four weeks, eventually peaking at number 82.  The song entered the magazine's list of the 40 most popular Easy Listening songs of the week in the following issue, on August 28, for its first of five weeks, during which time it reached number 29.

You've Got a Friend was released on compact disc for the first time as one of two albums on one CD by Collectables Records on February 5, 2002, the other album being Williams's Columbia release from the fall of 1970, The Andy Williams Show.  Collectables included this CD in a box set entitled Classic Album Collection, Vol. 2, which contains 15 of his studio albums and two compilations and was released on November 29, 2002.

Reception

Billboard magazine wrote, "In what may be one of his finest and most commercial packages of all time, Williams has a chart winner in this delightful program. Along with his new single, 'A Song for You', he turns in exceptional treatments of Carole King's 'You've Got a Friend', Kris Kristofferson's 'Help Me Make It Through the Night', and Nichols-Williams's 'Rainy Days and Mondays'."

Track listing

Side one
 "You've Got a Friend" (Carole King) – 4:44
 "Help Me Make It Through the Night" (Kris Kristofferson) – 2:36
 "How Can You Mend a Broken Heart?" (Barry Gibb, Robin Gibb) – 3:41
 "Rainy Days and Mondays" (Roger Nichols, Paul Williams) – 2:58
 "Never Can Say Goodbye" (Clifton Davis) – 3:33

Side two
 "It's Too Late" (Carole King) – 3:56
 "I'll Be There" (Hal Davis, Berry Gordy, Willie Hutch, Bob West) – 2:39
 "Here Comes That Rainy Day Feeling Again" (Roger Cook, Roger Greenaway, Tony Macaulay) – 2:33
 "If" (David Gates) – 2:44
 "For All We Know" from Lovers and Other Strangers (Jimmy Griffin, Fred Karlin, Robb Royer) – 3:12
 "A Song for You" (Leon Russell) – 3:07

Recording dates
From the liner notes for the 2002 CD:

April 22, 1971 - "Help Me Make It Through the Night", "Rainy Days and Mondays", "Never Can Say Goodbye", "I'll Be There", "For All We Know"
June 10, 1971 - "You've Got a Friend", "It's Too Late", "If"
July 7, 1971 - "How Can You Mend a Broken Heart", "Here Comes That Rainy Day Feeling Again", "A Song for You"

Song information

"You've Got a Friend" had its biggest success as a recording by James Taylor that spent a week at number one on the Billboard Hot 100 and Easy Listening chart, reached number four on the UK singles chart, received Gold certification from the Recording Industry Association of America, and earned Taylor and songwriter Carole King respective Grammys for Best Vocal Performance, Male and Song of the Year. Sammi Smith had the most popular cover of "Help Me Make It Through the Night", spending three weeks at number one on Billboard'''s Country chart, reaching number eight pop and number three Easy Listening, receiving Gold certification, and earning songwriter Kris Kristofferson and Smith respective Grammys for Best Country Song and Best Country Vocal Performance, Female.

"How Can You Mend a Broken Heart?" by the Bee Gees went to number one for four weeks on the Billboard Hot 100 and number four on the magazine's Easy Listening chart in addition to receiving Gold certification from the RIAA. "Rainy Days and Mondays" by The Carpenters is yet another Gold record covered here. They enjoyed two weeks with the song at number two pop and four weeks at number one Easy Listening. The Jackson 5 had the most successful version of "Never Can Say Goodbye" with three weeks at number two on the Hot 100, three weeks at number one on the R&B chart, and a number 33 hit in the UK.

Carole King's "It's Too Late" spent five weeks at number one on the pop and Easy Listening charts, reached number six UK, received Gold certification, and earned King the Grammy Award for Record of the Year. The Jackson 5 song "I'll Be There" had five weeks at number one on the Hot 100 and six weeks at number one R&B and reached number 24 Easy Listening and number four UK.  The Fortunes got as high as number 15 pop and number eight Easy Listening with "Here Comes That Rainy Day Feeling Again".

Bread took "If" to number four on the Hot 100 and also spent three weeks at number one on the Easy Listening chart. The song on this album entitled "For All We Know" won the Oscar for Best Original Song for its inclusion in the 1970 film Lovers and Other Strangers and was another Gold single for The Carpenters, this time reaching number three pop and spending three weeks at number one Easy Listening. "A Song for You" originally appeared on Leon Russell's self-titled debut album in 1970. Aside from Williams, the only other artist to chart the song during this period was Jaye P. Morgan, who reached 105 while "bubbling under" the Hot 100 for three weeks that began in the August 21, 1971, issue of Billboard'' magazine—the same issue in which Williams's chart run with the song began.

Personnel
From the liner notes for the original album:

Andy Williams - vocals
Dick Glasser - producer
Al Capps - arranger ("You've Got a Friend", "Rainy Days and Mondays", "It's Too Late", "If", "For All We Know")
Ernie Freeman - arranger ("Help Me Make It Through the Night", "How Can You Mend a Broken Heart?", "Never Can Say Goodbye", "Here Comes That Rainy Day Feeling Again", "A Song for You")
Dick Hazard - arranger ("I'll Be There")
Eric Prestidge - engineer, remix engineer
Peter Romano - engineer
Rafael O. Valentin - engineer
Norman Seeff - cover photos
Virginia Team - design

References

Bibliography

1971 albums
Andy Williams albums
Albums produced by Dick Glasser
Columbia Records albums